Claudelands Rovers is a semi professional football club in New Zealand. It is based in the Hamilton suburb of Hamilton East.  

Claudelands Rovers Premier Men's Team plays in the NRFL Southern Conference. The club also fields an U-23 Northern League team as a reserve grade side, and men's teams in several WAIBOP Football competitions.

The club's women's team has previously won the Lotto Northern League Premier Women's competition, but in 2021 plays in the WAIBOP Football W-League competition.

In 2010 the Claudelands Rovers Premier Women won the New Zealand National Women's Knockout Cup, defeating Three Kings United in the final played at North Harbour Stadium.

The club also has a large junior program.

References

External links
New Zealand 2004/05 Season Results
club website

Association football clubs in Hamilton, New Zealand